HTC Sense is a software suite developed by HTC, used primarily on the company's Android-based devices. Serving as a successor to HTC's TouchFLO 3D software for Windows Mobile, Sense modifies many aspects of the Android user experience, incorporating additional features (such as an altered home screen and keyboard), additional widgets, re-designed applications, and additional HTC-developed applications. The first device with Sense, the HTC Hero, was released in 2009. The HD2 running Windows Mobile 6.5, released later the same year, included Sense. Following the release of the Hero, all future Android devices by HTC were shipped with Sense, except for the Nexus One, the Desire Z (T-Mobile G2 in the US), the HTC First, the Google Pixel and Pixel 2, and the Nexus 9 which used a stock version of Android. Also some HTC smartphones that are using MediaTek processors come without HTC Sense.

At the Mobile World Congress 2010, HTC debuted their new updated HTC Sense UI on the HTC Desire and HTC Legend, with an upgrade available for the Hero and Magic. The new version was based upon Android 2.1 and featured interface features such as the Friend Stream widget, which aggregated Twitter, Facebook and Flickr information and Leap, which allows access to all home screens at once.

When the HTC Sensation was released, it featured HTC Sense 3.0, which added interface elements, including an updated lock screen that allows applications to be pinned directly to it for easier access. The HTC EVO 3D also features Sense 3.0.

Two versions of Sense were developed for Android 4.0. Sense 4.0, included on HTC's new devices beginning in 2012 (such as the HTC One X), was designed to provide a refreshed and more minimalist look closer to stock Android than previous versions, while integrating features provided by Android 4.0. Sense 3.6, which was distributed through updates to older HTC phones, was designed to maintain a closer resemblance to previous versions of Sense on Android 2.3.

Versions

HTC Sense (2009) 

The original version of Sense was first introduced by the HTC Hero.

Espresso (2010) 

Espresso was the codename for the version of Sense running atop T-Mobile myTouch devices. It debuted on the T-Mobile myTouch 3G (HTC Espresso) and the T-Mobile myTouch 4G (HTC Glacier). It features all of the widgets and apps of regular Sense, but the color of apps and certain interface elements are blue instead of green. "Pushed in" apps appear on the home screen.

Sense 1.9 (2010) 
Sense 1.9 debuted on the HTC Desire and HTC Legend and provided upgrades for the HTC Hero and HTC Magic. It introduced FriendStream and the Leap feature similar to macOS's Mission Control.

Sense 3.0 (2011) 

Sense 3.0 debuted on the HTC Sensation. This version introduced HTC Watch, a movie streaming service, and updated the lockscreen with app shortcuts for easier access. Additional lockscreen styles included widgets that display content such as weather and photos. It also features 3D homescreen transition effects when swiping among homescreens.

Sense 3.6 (2012) 

Legacy HTC devices that received updates to Android 4.0 use Sense 3.6; an update integrating select features from Sense 4 (such as the updated home screen), but visual and design elements from Sense 3.5.

Sense 4.0 (2012) 

Sense 4.0 was first introduced by the HTC One series of devices with Android 4.0 unveiled in 2012; the One X, One S, and One V. Many aspects of the Sense interface were modified to closer resemble the standard Android interface (such as its home screen, which now uses a dock of shortcuts instead of the fixed "All Apps", "Phone", and "Personalize" buttons of previous versions), a new application switcher using cards, updated stock apps, and Beats Audio support.

Sense 4.1 (2012) 

Sense 4.1 was a minor update to the original Sense 4.0. It ran on top of Android 4.0.4 as opposed to Android 4.0.3, and included many bug fixes and optimizations. The only device of the original HTC One series not to receive this update was the HTC One V.

Sense 4.5 or 4+ (2012) 

Announced in 2012 for the HTC One X+, updates with Sense 4+ was also released with Android 4.1.2 updates for the One X, One S, Evo 4G LTE, One SV LTE / 3G and Desire X..

Sense 5 (2013) 

Announced in April 2013 for the 2013 HTC One; it features a more minimalistic design and a new scrolling news aggregator on the home screen known as "BlinkFeed", which displays a scrolling grid of news headlines and social network content. By default, Sense 5 uses three home screen pages: two with the traditional grid for apps and widgets (as with previous devices, but using a grid with fewer spaces for apps by default), and the default screen with a redesigned clock and BlinkFeed, although more pages can still be added. Sense 5.0 was not only going to be exclusive to the HTC One; on February 28, 2013, HTC announced that it would provide updates for the Butterfly, One S (later discontinued), and the One X/X+ to Sense 5.0 in the coming months.

Sense 5.5 (2013) 

Announced in September 2013 for the HTC One Max; it adds RSS and Google+ support to BlinkFeed, allows users to disable BlinkFeed entirely, adds a tool for making animated GIFs, and additional Highlights themes.

Sense 6.0 (2014) 

Sense 6.0, nicknamed "Sixth Sense", was announced alongside the 2014 HTC One (M8) on March 25, 2014. Based on Android 4.4 "KitKat", it is similar to Sense 5, but offers new customization options (such as color themes and new font choices), increased use of transparency effects (particularly on the home screen, and on Sense 6.0 devices which use on-screen buttons), and updates to some of its included apps. BlinkFeed, Gallery, TV, and Zoe are now updated independently of Sense through Google Play Store.

The HTC One (2013), One Mini and One Max are updated to 6.0 via a software update.

Sense 7.0 (2015) 

Sense 7.0 was announced at the Mobile World Congress on March 1, 2015 alongside the HTC One M9. It is based on Android 5.0 "Lollipop", and is largely the same as Sense 6.0 as far as the default user interface is concerned, save for a few tweaked icons and a new weather clock widget. Perhaps the most notable new feature is the new user interface theming app (simply called "Themes"), which allows users to alter the color schemes, icons, sounds, and fonts throughout the operating system. Users can either create their own themes from scratch or download pre-made ones created by HTC or fellow users. Another major new feature is the ability to customize the navigation buttons across the bottom of the display; users can now change their order and add a fourth button, such as a power button or one that hides the navigation bar altogether.

Advertisements in Blinkfeed
HTC confirmed that advertisements will be displayed in the Blinkfeed. However, HTC has given the option for the user to opt-out from receiving these advertisements. In August 2015, owners of HTC M8 and M9 in the United States reported in reddit that they have received a push-notification promoting the upcoming Fantastic Four movie theme.

HTC Sense 10 (2018) 

The HTC U12+ ships with Android 8.0 Oreo with an overlay of HTC Sense UI 10.0.  It features Project Treble, which allows for faster updates after new versions of Android appear.  The Amazon Alexa, Google Assistant, and HTC Sense Companion virtual assistants come pre-installed.

List of devices with HTC Sense

Sense 10.10 
 HTC U19e
 HTC Desire 19+
 HTC Desire 19s

Sense 10.0 
 HTC U12+ (upgradable to Sense 10.10)
 HTC U12 Life

Sense 9.0 
 HTC U11 (upgradable to Sense 10.0)
 HTC U11+ (upgradable to Sense 10.0)

Sense 8.0 
 HTC 10
 HTC U Ultra
 HTC U Play

Sense 7.0 
 HTC One A9
 HTC One X9
 HTC Desire 628
 HTC Desire 828
 HTC Desire 816 dual sim(via software update)
 HTC One M9
 HTC One M9+
HTC One E9s
 HTC One E9+
 HTC One M8 (via software update) 
 HTC One ME
 HTC Desire 728
HTC Desire Eye (via software update)
 HTC One E8

Sense 6.1 

 HTC Desire 510

Sense 6.0 

 HTC One (M8)
 HTC One (via software update)
 HTC One Max (via software update)
 HTC One Mini 2
 HTC One Mini (via software update)
 HTC One E8
 HTC One (M8 EYE)
 HTC Butterfly S (via Android 4.4.2 update)
 HTC Butterfly 2 
 HTC Desire 816G
 HTC Desire 816
 HTC Desire 610
 HTC Desire 620
 HTC Desire 820
 HTC Desire 820Q
 HTC Desire 826
 HTC Desire Eye
 HTC Droid DNA (via Flashing a ROM)

Sense 5.5 
 HTC Butterfly/Droid DNA (via Android 4.4 update)
 HTC Desire 601 (via Android 4.4 update)
 HTC One (via software update)
 HTC One Max
 HTC One Mini (via software update)

Sense 5.0 
 HTC Desire 700 dual sim
 HTC Desire 616
 HTC Desire 601
 HTC Desire 300
 HTC Desire 600
 HTC Desire 500
 HTC Desire 310
 HTC Butterfly S
 HTC One Mini
 HTC One
 HTC One X+ (via Android 4.2 update)
 HTC Evo 4G LTE (via Android 4.3 update)
 HTC One X (via Android 4.2 update, international version only)
HTC One XL (via Android 4.2 update, international version only)
 HTC Butterfly/Droid DNA (via Android 4.2 update)
HTC One SV (via Android 4.2 update)

Sense 4+ 

HTC Desire 501
HTC One X+
HTC One X (via Android 4.1 update)
HTC One S (via Android 4.1 update)
HTC Evo 4G LTE (via Android 4.1 update)
HTC J
HTC Butterfly/Droid DNA
HTC One SV (via Android 4.1 update)
HTC Desire X (via Android 4.1 update)

Sense 4.1 

HTC One S (via software update)
HTC Desire X
HTC One SV
HTC One X (via software update)
HTC One VX

Sense 4.0 

HTC Desire 200
HTC One V
HTC One X
HTC One S
HTC Desire C
HTC Desire V
HTC Desire VC
HTC Droid Incredible 4G LTE

Sense 3.6 

Sense 3.6 is exclusively obtained through Android 4.0 updates for existing devices.
HTC Sensation XL
HTC Sensation XE
HTC Sensation
HTC Evo 3D (pre-loaded on Virgin Mobile version)
HTC Evo Design 4G (pre-loaded on Boost Mobile version)
HTC Incredible S (all variants)
HTC Rezound
HTC Desire S
HTC Sensation 4G

Sense 3.5 

HTC Desire S
HTC Desire HD/HTC Inspire 4G
HTC Explorer
HTC Rhyme

Sense 2.0 / 2.1 

 HTC ChaCha (Sense 2.1 for Messenger)
 HTC Salsa (Sense 2.1 for Messenger)
 HTC Desire Z
 HTC Desire
 HTC Flyer (Sense 2.1 for Tablet)
 HTC Jetstream (Sense 2.1 for Tablet)
 HTC Wildfire S

Sense 1.0 

 HTC Evo Shift 4G
 HTC EVO 4G
 HTC Droid Incredible
 HTC Aria / Gratia
 HTC Legend
 HTC Wildfire
 HTC Merge

Original Sense 

 HTC Droid Eris
 HTC Hero / HTC Hero CDMA (Sprint)
 HTC Tattoo

Espresso Sense 

 T-Mobile myTouch 3G Slide: Espresso Sense 1.0
 T-Mobile myTouch 4G: Espresso Sense 2.0
 T-Mobile myTouch 4G Slide: Espresso Sense 3.0

HTC devices without Sense 

Most HTC devices released since the introduction of Sense incorporate it, but several do not, including the Nexus One (released as the first device in the Nexus series), the T-Mobile G2 (a variation of the HTC Desire Z with stock Android), the HTC First (after Facebook Home is disabled), and a special edition HTC One released on Google Play in June 2013. In March 2014 HTC announced the Desire 310 running Android 4.2.2 with the addition of Blinkfeed and Video Highlights. Like  predecessor the HTC One (M8) also got a Google Play Edition, running Android 4.4.2. The Nexus 9 Tablet was unveiled by Google on October 15, 2014 running Android 5.0.

Notes

References

External links 
 htcsense.com - a HTC Corporation website for backing up phone data, locating a phone, and interface customization.
 HTC Sense interface upgrade first look

HTC Corporation
Android (operating system) software
Computer-related introductions in 2009
Mobile operating systems